After campaigning against the foreign policy of the Beaconsfield ministry, William Gladstone led the Liberal Party to victory in the 1880 general election. The nominal leader of the Party, Lord Hartington, resigned in Gladstone's favour and Gladstone was appointed Prime Minister of the United Kingdom for a second time by Queen Victoria. He pursued a policy of parliamentary reform, but his government became wildly unpopular after the death of General Gordon in 1885. Gladstone was held responsible, and resigned, leaving the way free for the Conservatives under Lord Salisbury to form a government.

Cabinet; April 1880 – June 1885 

{| class=wikitable
|-
!Office||Name||Term
|-
|First Lord of the TreasuryLeader of the House of Commons||William Gladstone||April 1880 – June 1886
|-
|Lord Chancellor||The Lord Selborne†||April 1880 – June 1885
|-
|Lord President of the Council||The Earl Spencer||April 1880 – March 1883
|-
| ||The Lord Carlingford||March 1883 – June 1885
|-
|Lord Privy Seal||The Duke of Argyll||April 1880 – May 1881
|-
| ||The Lord Carlingford||May 1881 – March 1885
|-
| ||The Earl of Rosebery||March 1885 – June 1885
|-
|Home Secretary||Sir William Harcourt||April 1880 – June 1885
|-
|Foreign SecretaryLeader of the House of Lords||The Earl Granville||April 1880 – June 1885
|-
|Secretary of State for the Colonies||The Earl of Kimberley||April 1880 – December 1882
|-
| ||The Earl of Derby||December 1882 – June 1885
|-
|Secretary of State for War||Hugh Childers||April 1880 – December 1882
|-
| ||Marquess of Hartington||December 1882 – June 1885
|-
|Secretary of State for India||Marquess of Hartington||April 1880 – December 1882
|-
| ||The Earl of Kimberley||December 1882 – June 1885
|-
|Chancellor of the Exchequer||William Gladstone||April 1880 – December 1882
|-
| ||Hugh Childers||December 1882 – June 1885
|-
|First Lord of the Admiralty||The Earl of Northbrook||April 1880 – June 1885
|-
|President of the Board of Trade||Joseph Chamberlain||April 1880 – June 1885
|-
|President of the Local Government Board||John George Dodson||April 1880 – December 1882
|-
| ||Sir Charles Dilke, Bt||December 1882 – June 1885
|-
|Chancellor of the Duchy of Lancaster||John Bright||April 1880 – July 1882
|-
| ||The Earl of Kimberley||July 1882 – December 1882
|-
| ||John George Dodson||December 1882 – October 1884
|-
| ||George Otto Trevelyan||October 1884 – June 1885
|-
|Postmaster General||Henry Fawcett||3 May 1880 – 6 November 1884
|-
| ||George John Shaw-Lefevre||7 November 1884 – 9 June 1885
|-
|Chief Secretary for Ireland||William Edward Forster||April 1880 – May 1882
|-
| ||colspan=2|successor not in the cabinet
|-
|Lord Lieutenant of Ireland||The Earl Spencer||April 1882 – June 1885
|}

†Created Earl of Selborne in 1882.

 Notes 

William Gladstone served as both First Lord of the Treasury and Chancellor of the Exchequer between April 1880 and December 1882.
The Earl Spencer served as both Lord President and Lord Lieutenant of Ireland between April 1882 and March 1883.
The Earl of Kimberley served as both Colonial Secretary and Chancellor of the Duchy of Lancaster between July and December 1882.
The Lord Carlingford served as both Lord Privy Seal and Lord President between March 1883 and March 1885.

 Changes 
May 1881: The Lord Carlingford succeeds the Duke of Argyll as Lord Privy Seal.
April 1882: The Earl Spencer becomes Lord Lieutenant of Ireland, but retains his seat in the cabinet and his position as Lord President.
May 1882: William Edward Forster resigns as Chief Secretary for Ireland. His successor is not in the cabinet.
July 1882: The Earl of Kimberley succeeds John Bright as Chancellor of the Duchy of Lancaster remaining also Colonial Secretary.
December 1882: Hugh Childers succeeds William Gladstone as Chancellor of the Exchequer. Lord Hartington succeeds Childers as Secretary for War. Kimberley succeeds Hartington as Secretary for India. The Earl of Derby succeeds Kimberley as Colonial Secretary. John George Dodson succeeds Kimberley as Chancellor of the Duchy of Lancaster. Sir Charles Dilke succeeds Dodson as President of the Local Government Board.
March 1883: Carlingford succeeds Spencer as Lord President, remaining also Lord Privy Seal. Spencer remains in the Cabinet as Lord Lieutenant of Ireland.
October 1884: George Otto Trevelyan succeeds Dodson as Chancellor of the Duchy of Lancaster.
March 1885: The Earl of Rosebery succeeds Carlingford as Lord Privy Seal. Carlingford remains Lord President. George John Shaw-Lefevre enters the cabinet as Postmaster-General.

List of ministers
Cabinet members are listed in bold' face.

Notes

References

Further reading
 McCarthy, Justin H. England under Gladstone, 1880–1885'' (1885). online

British ministries
Government
1880s in the United Kingdom
1880 establishments in the United Kingdom
1885 disestablishments in the United Kingdom
Ministry 2
Cabinets established in 1880
Cabinets disestablished in 1885